Art and Feminism (stylized as Art+Feminism) is an annual worldwide edit-a-thon to add content to Wikipedia about women artists, which started in 2014. The project has been described as "a massive multinational effort to correct a persistent bias in Wikipedia, which is disproportionately written by and about men".

In 2014, Art+Feminism's inaugural campaign attracted 600 volunteers at 30 separate events. The following year, a total of 1,300 volunteers attended 70 events that took place across 17 different countries, on four continents. Since then more than 20,000 people have taken part in over 1,500 events. This has led to positive results in over 100,000 Wikipedia articles.  More than 18,000 people have participated and created or improved approximately 84,000 Wikipedia articles at 1,260 events globally,

Establishment

Art+Feminism started when Artstor librarian Siân Evans was designing a project for women and art for the Art Libraries Society of North America. Evans talked with fellow curator Jacqueline Mabey, who had been impressed by Wikipedia contributors' organization of edit-a-thon events to commemorate Ada Lovelace. Mabey spoke with Michael Mandiberg, a professor at the City University of New York who had been incorporating Wikipedia into classroom learning. Mandiberg in turn talked with Laurel Ptak, a fellow at the art and technology non-profit Eyebeam, who agreed to help plan the event. The team then recruited local Wikipedians Dorothy Howard, then Wikipedian in residence at Metropolitan New York Library Council; and Richard Knipel, then representing the local chapter of Wikipedia contributors through Wikimedia New York City.

One reason for establishing the Art+Feminism project included responding to negative media coverage about Wikipedia's cataloging system. The project continues to fill content gaps in Wikipedia and increase the number of female contributors. Only about 17 percent of biographies on Wikipedia are about women and only about 15 percent of Wikipedia editors are female. Kira Wisniewski was appointed Art+Feminism's executive director in 2020.

Events

Outside the United States, the 2015 event received media coverage at locations including Australia, Canada, Cambodia, India, New Zealand, and Scotland. Inside the United States, the event received media coverage at the flagship location in New York, and also in California, Kansas, Pennsylvania, Texas, and West Virginia.

In 2020, due to concerns from the COVID-19 pandemic, the event was held virtually, via the Zoom video conferencing app.
In 2021, the Art+Feminism campaign was again made virtual due to COVID-19 concerns.

Although the project is global, director Kira Wisniewski lives in Baltimore and personally organizes events and collaborations with cultural organizations in that area.

Content contributed by participants in the editing events is tracked in a coordinating forum on Wikipedia.

Reception

In November 2014, Foreign Policy magazine named Evans, Mabey, Mandiberg, Knipel, Howard, and Ptak as "global thinkers" for addressing gender bias on Wikipedia.

See also 

 Feminist art criticism
 Women in Red
 Women's empowerment

References

2018 Wikipedia Edit- a-thon: Art + Feminism. (n.d.). The Museum of Modern Art. Retrieved March 26, 2022, from https://www.moma.org/calendar/events/3941.

External links

 
 Art+Feminism at Wikipedia Meetup
 
 

2014 establishments in the United States
Wikipedia